Adán Adolfo Balbín Silva (born 13 October 1986) is a Peruvian footballer. He currently plays for Sport Boys and the Peru national team, as a defensive midfielder or centre back.

Club career
Balbín started his professional career with his hometown club Unión Huaral in 2005. Then in 2007 he joined first division club Coronel Bolognesi. There the manager of Bolognesi at the time, Juan Reynoso, decided to use him as a centre back. With Bolognesi he won his first professional title, which was the 2007 Torneo Clausura. Adan played in Tacna until the end of the 2008 season. In January 2009 Balbín joined Universidad San Martín. In December 2013, he moved to play for Sporting Cristal.

International career 
His impressive performances for his club convinced the new national team coach Sergio Markarian to give him his chance to play for the national team. On November 17, 2010, Balbín made his national team debut in friendly against Colombia by substituting Josepmir Ballón late in the match. The friendly was played in bogota and finished in a 1–1 draw.

Honours

Club
Coronel Bolognesi FC
Apertura: 2007
Universidad San Martín
Torneo Descentralizado: 2010

Country 
Peru national team
Copa América: Bronze medal 2011

References

External links

1986 births
Living people
People from Lima Region
Peruvian footballers
Peru international footballers
Unión Huaral footballers
Coronel Bolognesi footballers
Club Deportivo Universidad de San Martín de Porres players
Sporting Cristal footballers
Unión Comercio footballers
Club Universitario de Deportes footballers
Real Garcilaso footballers
Sport Boys footballers
Peruvian Primera División players
Association football midfielders
Association football central defenders
Association football utility players
2011 Copa América players
Copa América Centenario players